Rombauer is an unincorporated community in eastern Butler County, Missouri, United States.

History
A post office called Rombauer has been in operation since 1902.  The community was named after Roderick E. Rombauer, a Missouri judge.

References

Unincorporated communities in Butler County, Missouri
Unincorporated communities in Missouri